Giorgio Saviane (16 February 1916 – 18 December 2000) was an Italian author.

He received a Laurea in Giurisprudenza from University of Padua and then moved to Florence to practice as a lawyer.
During his period in Florence he started his career as a writer.
From the very beginning, Saviane adopts an introspective style of writing that will characterize all his future writings.

His best known novels are Eutanasia di un amore and Il mare verticale.

Books 
Le due folle, Guanda, Parma 1957; Rizzoli, Milano 1968; Mondadori, Milano 1982; Nuova Eri, Torino 1994
L'inquisito, Lerici, Milano 1961; Rizzoli, Milano 1968; Mondadori, Milano 1982; Newton Compton, Roma 1994
Il papa, Rizzoli, Milano 1963; Rusconi, Milano 1975; BUR, Milano 1980; Lucarini, Roma 1985; Newton Compton, Roma 1995
Il passo lungo, Rizzoli, Milano 1965; Rusconi, Milano 1974; Mondadori, Milano 1981; Juvenilia, Bergamo 1987; Newton Compton, Roma 1995
Le molte giustizie (a cura di), Ferro, Milano 1967
Di profilo si nasce, Bietti, Milano 1973
Il mare verticale, Rusconi, Milano 1973; BUR, Milano 1979; Mondadori, Milano 1987; Newton Compton, Roma 1994
Eutanasia di un amore, Rizzoli, Milano 1976; BUR, Milano 1978; Mondadori, Milano 1993
La donna di legno, Rizzoli, Milano 1979; BUR, Milano 1981
Getsemani, Mondadori, Milano 1980
Di profilo si nasce, Mondadori, Milano 1982
Il tesoro dei Pellizzari, Mondadori Milano 1982
Racconti, Liguori, Napoli 1983
La casa dei Pellizzari, Mursia, Milano 1983
Il mosca e l'agnello, SEI, Torino 1984
Cenerentola a Urbino, Sansoni, Firenze 1985
Il terzo aspetto, Mondadori, Milano 1987
Diario intimo di un cattivo, Rizzoli, Milano 1989
Il gatto Lorenzino e altri racconti, Mondadori, Milano 1989
Il narratore e i suoi testi, La nuova Italia, Firenze 1990 (antologia - Premio Pirandello per la narrativa)
L'automobile a due ruote, Guida, Napoli 1990 (con L'attrice di Michela Fassa)
Una vergogna civile, Rizzoli, Milano 1991
In attesa di lei, Mondadori, Milano 1992
Voglio parlare con Dio, Mondadori, Milano 1996
Giacomo Leopardi e l'amore (a cura di), Ibiskos, Empoli 1998 (su Giacomo Leopardi)
Barbetta e l'agnello, Cartedit, Monte Cremasco 1998

References 

1916 births
2000 deaths
20th-century Italian lawyers
20th-century Italian novelists
20th-century Italian male writers
Italian male novelists